Meganola fuscula is a species of nolid moth in the family Nolidae. It is found in North America.

The MONA or Hodges number for Meganola fuscula is 8985.

References

Further reading

 
 
 

Nolinae
Articles created by Qbugbot
Moths described in 1881